Cormorant Rock is a townland in County Antrim, Northern Ireland.

Townlands of County Antrim
Civil Parish of Drummaul